The 2022 season was the 44th season in the existence of Kuala Lumpur City's and the club's 2nd consecutive season in the top flight of Malaysian football. In addition to the domestic league, Kuala Lumpur City participated in this season's edition of Malaysia FA Cup and the Malaysia Cup.

Squad information

Transfers

1st leg
In:

Out:

Competitions

Piala Sumbangsih

Malaysia Super League

League table

Matches

Malaysia FA Cup

Malaysia Cup

AFC Cup

Group H

Statistics

Appearances and goals
Players with no appearances not included in the list.

References

External links
 Official website

Kuala Lumpur City F.C.
2022
Kuala Lumpur City